Kamulu is a settlement located  from Nairobi's central business district, Kenya, within Nairobi County, Kasarani constituency. It lies on the east side of Jomo Kenyatta International Airport bordering Matungulu to the east, Mwalimu-Farm Ruiru to the north, Njiru to the west, Ruai/Embakasi Ranching on the north west, Drumvale to the south and Mihango/Utawala to the south west. It is in Ruai ward.

Local administration
Kamulu belongs to  Ruai ward of  Kasarani constituency of Nairobi County. It is a key part of the Nairobi Metropolitan Region.

Security
Kamulu police posts are located in Ngundu and Drumvale areas.The area is under Kamulu Police Station located in Riverside area

Education
Kamulu has two public ECDE institutions, Drumvale Primary School in Sir Henry and Ngundu Primary School in Ngundu. There are two public secondary institutions, Drumvale Secondary School in Drumvale and Nile Road Secondary School in Ngundu. Kamulu also has the public Kasarani Technical and Vocational College. The area also has various private learning institutions and colleges

Health
Kamulu has a government hospital in Ng'undu Area. It also has private dispensaries and chemists. Due to the population increase, plans to set up another hospital in the Sir Henry area were underway but put off due to unknown circumstances.

Transport
As such, the settlement can be accessed via Jogoo Road, Outer-Ring Road, Thika Road and the Nairobi Eastern Bypass Highway.

Neighbourhoods in Kamulu
Divisions in Kamulu include Acacia, Makongeni, Gituamba, Stage 26, Kanisani, Sir Henry, Acre Tano, Kingori's, Ngundu, Vina, Kamulu 1 and Kamulu 2. The boundary between Nairobi County and Machakos County lies at one end of the Kamulu area at the Athi River Bridge, making Kamulu the Eastern-most entry to Nairobi according to the District & Boundaries Act of 1992.

Notable landmarks
The region is the site of Kasarani Technical and Vocational College, Mwiki Goodhope Academy(MGA Schools) Kamulu, St.Vincent De Paul Catholic Church, Kenya Assemblies of God (KAG) Protestant church in Ngundu, Dominion Centre Internationall, Ngundu Level 4 hospital, Brookshine Schools, Made In The Streets, PCEA Ruai East, Panorama College, Drumvale Secondary School, Nile Road Secondary School, Prema Light Resort, Mama Fatuma Shop, Mugathe Resort, Kingoris Grounds, Drumvale Primary School, Kamulu Play Park, Brookshine Schools and Ng'undu Primary School. The Nairobi River and Mbagathi River pass through the peripheries of this area making it a key part of the Athi River Basin.

Kamulu real estate
The Kamulu neighborhood remains ones of the most sought-after areas for real estate development in Kasarani Constituency. In 2016, Kamulu was ranked among the fastest growing real-estate areas along Kangundo Road and it has experienced a rapid construction boom since then, with companies like Denver Group, Banita Real Estate, Fanaka Real Estate and Kamulu Heights opening branches there.

References 

Populated places in Nairobi Province
Suburbs of Nairobi
Populated places in Kenya
Nairobi